János Jankó (1833–1896) was a Hungarian painter, caricaturist  and graphicist. He is furthermore notable as one of the earliest Hungarian comics artists.

Life

Jankó was born in Tótkomlós. He started to teach graphics while he was still at high school. Later he studied in Vienna, where he became known for his caricatures. His drawings were published in several Hungarian humor magazines, and they were popular and typical of the era.

References

Hungarian illustrators
Hungarian comics artists
Hungarian caricaturists
1833 births
1896 deaths
People from Tótkomlós
19th-century Hungarian painters
Hungarian male painters
19th-century Hungarian male artists